Plecia americana is a species of March flies, insects in the family Bibionidae.

References

Bibionidae
Articles created by Qbugbot
Insects described in 1940